Endothelial cell-specific molecule 1 is a protein that in humans is encoded by the ESM1 gene.

This gene encodes a secreted protein which is mainly expressed in the endothelial cells in human lung and kidney tissues. The expression of this gene is regulated by cytokines, suggesting that it may play a role in endothelium-dependent pathological disorders. The transcript contains multiple polyadenylation and mRNA instability signals. 

The ESM-1 gene product is also called endocan since 2001, when it was characterized as a dermatan sulfate proteoglycan by Bechard et al.  Recently, endocan / ESM-1 has been described as a specific biomarker of tip cells during neoangiogenesis by independent teams. Endocan expression has been shown to be increase in presence of pro-angiogenic growth factors such as vascular endothelial growth factor (VEGF) or fibroblast growth factor 2 (FGF-2).   In hypervascularized cancers, overexpression of endocan has been detected by immunohistochemistry using monoclonal antibodies against endocan / ESM-1.

References

Further reading